Jamie-Lynn Sigler (born May 15, 1981) is an American actress. She is best known for her role as Meadow Soprano on the HBO series The Sopranos.

Early life
Sigler was born in Jericho, New York, on May 15, 1981, the daughter of Steve and Connie Sigler. She has two brothers named Adam and Brian. Her father was the founder of the Men's Senior Baseball League. Sigler is of Sephardic Jewish (Greek-Jewish) and Ashkenazi Jewish (Romanian-Jewish) descent through her father, and of Cuban descent through her mother. 

Sigler's mother was raised Catholic, but later converted to Judaism upon marrying Sigler's father. She attended Jericho High School and studied at the Cultural Arts Playhouse in Old Bethpage, New York. Sigler briefly attended New York University, but left after her first semester due to scheduling difficulties with her career.

Career

Acting
In 1997, Sigler was cast as Meadow Soprano, daughter of New Jersey mob boss Tony Soprano on the HBO series The Sopranos. When her manager first told her about auditioning for The Sopranos, Sigler thought she would have to sing soprano. She continued to play the role through the series finale in 2007.

Sigler played the title role in Cinderella on tour and at The Theatre at Madison Square Garden in 2001. She then spent five months on Broadway from October 2002 through February 2003 playing Belle in Beauty and the Beast.

In 2004, Sigler starred as "Hollywood Madam" Heidi Fleiss in the USA television movie Call Me: The Rise and Fall of Heidi Fleiss. In that same year, she had her first starring feature film role, Extreme Dating, an independent film. In 2005, Sigler starred in Love Wrecked and the following year in Homie Spumoni, when she played the role of Alli, the girlfriend of Renato/Leroy (Donald Faison) directed by Mike Cerron.

In 2008, Sigler appeared as herself in 13 episodes of the fifth and sixth season of the HBO series Entourage. In the fifth season, she appeared as the love interest of the character Sal 'Turtle' Assante, portrayed by Jerry Ferrara. She returned as a recurring guest star for season six of the series, after becoming Ferrara's real-life girlfriend. On November 17, 2008, Sigler guest-starred as Jillian on the TV series How I Met Your Mother in the episode "Woooo!". On the December 6, 2008 airing of Saturday Night Live, she appeared as the checkout girl for the Digital Short music video "Jizz in My Pants" by The Lonely Island.

In 2009, Sigler starred in the psychological thriller film Beneath the Dark, which originally had a working title of Wake. The same year, she appeared on ABC's Ugly Betty in a five-episode arc. From 2012 to 2013, she appeared as a main character in the short-lived series Guys with Kids.

In 2019, Sigler appeared on the game show Pyramid alongside Steve Schirripa.

In 2020, Sigler starred as a featured player in the Adult Swim sitcom Beef House.

Other endeavors 
Music

In 2001, Sigler released a pop album called Here to Heaven, which featured the single "Cry Baby." The album was a commercial failure. In 2007, she said she was "embarrassed" by the album and regretted releasing it. In 2012, she collaborated with Romeo Santos on the single "You" and appeared in its music video.

Writing

In 2002, Sigler co-authored her autobiography, Wise Girl: What I've Learned About Life, Love, and Loss.

Podcast

In September 2019, Sigler began hosting a podcast called Pajama Pants alongside The Sopranos co-star Robert Iler and YouTube comedian Kassem G. The podcast ran through December 2022, the ending of the show having been announced the previous month.

Personal life
Sigler met Abraxas "A.J." DiScala when she was 19, and he became her manager. They began dating shortly before she turned 21, and married on July 11, 2003. She subsequently changed her name to Jamie-Lynn DiScala. They separated in September 2005, and she resumed using her maiden name. She then dated restaurateur Scott Sartiano from 2006 to 2008.

In 2008, Sigler visited Israel through the Birthright Israel program and was moved by the trip, calling Israel "one of the most beautiful, inspiring places [she's] ever been to". She said that the trip gave her a greater understanding of her Jewish ancestry. Also in 2008, she began a relationship with actor Jerry Ferrara, whom she met while guest-starring on Entourage as a love interest of Ferrara's character. They split up in 2009. She later dated football player Mark Sanchez.

In 2012, Sigler began dating baseball player Cutter Dykstra, the son of former Major League Baseball player Lenny Dykstra. The two became engaged on January 28, 2013, and announced in February 2013 that they were expecting their first child. Sigler gave birth to their first son, on August 28, 2013. They were married in Palm Springs, California, on January 16, 2016. The couple had their second son on January 15, 2018.

In January 2016, Sigler revealed that she was diagnosed with multiple sclerosis when she was 20 years old. In 2000, while filming Campfire Stories in Hamburg, New Jersey, Sigler was paralyzed from the waist down for several days. This symptom turned out to be related to multiple sclerosis, but it was misdiagnosed as Lyme disease at the time.

Filmography

Film

Television

Music videos

Discography
2001: Here to Heaven

References

External links

1981 births
Living people
20th-century American actresses
20th-century Sephardi Jews
Actresses from New York (state)
American child actresses
American film actresses
American people of Cuban descent
American people of Greek-Jewish descent
American people of Romanian-Jewish descent
American Ashkenazi Jews
American Sephardic Jews
American television actresses
Hispanic and Latino American actresses
Jewish American actresses
Jewish American musicians
People from Jericho, New York
People from Queens, New York
Singers from New York (state)
People with multiple sclerosis
21st-century American singers
21st-century American women singers
21st-century Sephardi Jews
21st-century American actresses
21st-century American Jews